Parichehr is a 1951 Iranian drama film directed by Fazlollah Bayegan.

Cast
 Fazlollah Bayegan 
 Rogheyeh Chehreh-Azad 
 Ali Tabesh

References

Bibliography 
 Mohammad Ali Issari. Cinema in Iran, 1900-1979. Scarecrow Press, 1989.

External links 
 

1951 films
1950s Persian-language films
Iranian black-and-white films
Iranian drama films
1951 drama films